In mathematics, derived noncommutative algebraic geometry, the derived version of noncommutative algebraic geometry, is the geometric study of derived categories and related constructions of triangulated categories using categorical tools. Some basic examples include the bounded derived category of coherent sheaves on a smooth variety, called its derived category, or the derived category of perfect complexes on an algebraic variety, denoted . For instance, the derived category of coherent sheaves  on a smooth projective variety can be used as an invariant of the underlying variety for many cases (if  has an ample (anti-)canonical sheaf). Unfortunately, studying derived categories as geometric objects of themselves does not have a standardized name.

Derived category of projective line

 

if we consider the two terms on the right as a complex, then we get the distinguished triangle

 

Since  we have constructed this sheaf  using only categorical tools. We could repeat this again by tensoring the Euler sequence by the flat sheaf , and apply the cone construction again. If we take the duals of the sheaves, then we can construct all of the line bundles in  using only its triangulated structure. It turns out the correct way of studying derived categories from its objects and triangulated structure is with exceptional collections.

Semiorthogonal decompositions and exceptional collections

The technical tools for encoding this construction are semiorthogonal decompositions and exceptional collections. A semiorthogonal decomposition of a triangulated category  is a collection of full triangulated subcategories  such that the following two properties hold

(1) For objects  we have  for 

such that . Notice this is analogous to a filtration of an object in an abelian category such that the cokernels live in a specific subcategory.

We can specialize this a little further by considering exceptional collections of objects, which generate their own subcategories. An object  in a triangulated category is called exceptional if the following property holds

where  is the underlying field of the vector space of morphisms. A collection of exceptional objects  is an exceptional collection of length  if for any  and any , we have

and is a strong exceptional collection if in addition, for any  and any , we have

We can then decompose our triangulated category into the semiorthogonal decomposition

where , the subcategory of objects in  such that . If in addition  then the strong exceptional collection is called full.

Beilinson's theorem
Beilinson provided the first example of a full strong exceptional collection. In the derived category  the line bundles  form a full strong exceptional collection. He proves the theorem in two parts. First showing these objects are an exceptional collection and second by showing the diagonal  of  has a resolution whose compositions are tensors of the pullback of the exceptional objects.

Technical Lemma

This gives the exact complexwhich gives a way to construct  using the sheaves , since they are the sheaves used in all terms in the above exact sequence, except for

Orlov's reconstruction theorem
If  is a smooth projective variety with ample (anti-)canonical sheaf and there is an equivalence of derived categories , then there is an isomorphism of the underlying varieties.

Sketch of proof 
The isomorphism between these two functors gives an isomorphism of the set of underlying points of the derived categories. Then, what needs to be check is an ismorphism , for any , giving an isomorphism of canonical rings

 

If  can be shown to be (anti-)ample, then the proj of these rings will give an isomorphism . All of the details are contained in Dolgachev's notes.

Failure of reconstruction 
This theorem fails in the case  is Calabi-Yau, since , or is the product of a variety which is Calabi-Yau. Abelian varieties are a class of examples where a reconstruction theorem could never hold.

of derived categories. Since an abelian variety is generally not isomorphic to its dual, there are derived equivalent derived categories without isomorphic underlying varieties. There is an alternative theory of tensor triangulated geometry where we consider not only a triangulated category, but also a monoidal structure, i.e. a tensor product. This geometry has a full reconstruction theorem using the spectrum of categories.

Equivalences on K3 surfaces 
K3 surfaces are another class of examples where reconstruction fails due to their Calabi-Yau property. There is a criterion for determining whether or not two K3 surfaces are derived equivalent: the derived category of the K3 surface  is derived equivalent to another K3  if and only if there is a Hodge isometry , that is, an isomorphism of Hodge structure. Moreover, this theorem is reflected in the motivic world as well, where the Chow motives are isomorphic if and only if there is an isometry of Hodge structures.

Autoequivalences 
One nice application of the proof of this theorem is the identification of autoequivalences of the derived category of a smooth projective variety with ample (anti-)canonical sheaf. This is given by

Where an autoequivalence  is given by an automorphism , then tensored by a line bundle  and finally composed with a shift. Note that  acts on  via the polarization map, .

Relation with motives 

 

is there an induced map on the chow motives

 

such that  is a summand of ? In the case of K3 surfaces, a similar result has been confirmed since derived equivalent K3 surfaces have an isometry of Hodge structures, which gives an isomorphism of motives.

Derived category of singularities 
On a smooth variety there is an equivalence between the derived category  and the thick full triangulated  of perfect complexes. For separated, Noetherian schemes of finite Krull dimension (called the ELF condition) this is not the case, and Orlov defines the derived category of singularities as their difference using a quotient of categories. For an ELF scheme  its derived category of singularities is defined as

 

for a suitable definition of localization of triangulated categories.

Construction of localization 
Although localization of categories is defined for a class of morphisms  in the category closed under composition, we can construct such a class from a triangulated subcategory. It can be checked this forms a multiplicative system using the octahedral axiom for distinguished triangles. Given

 

with distinguished triangles

 

 

where , then there are distinguished triangles

 

  where  since  is closed under extensions. This new category has the following properties

 The category  has the following universal property: any exact functor  where  where , then it factors uniquely through the quotient functor , so there exists a morphism  such that .

Properties of singularity category 

 If  is a regular scheme, then every bounded complex of coherent sheaves is perfect. Hence the singularity category is trivial

Landau–Ginzburg models 
Kontsevich proposed a model for Landau–Ginzburg models which was worked out to the following definition: a Landau–Ginzburg model is a smooth variety  together with a morphism  which is flat. There are three associated categories which can be used to analyze the D-branes in a Landau–Ginzburg model using matrix factorizations from commutative algebra.

Associated categories 
With this definition, there are three categories which can be associated to any point , a -graded category , an exact category , and a triangulated category , each of which has objects

There is also a shift functor  send  to.The difference between these categories are their definition of morphisms. The most general of which is  whose morphisms are the -graded complex

Finally,  has the morphisms in  modulo the null-homotopies. Given  there is a mapping code  with maps

 where 

and
 where 

D-brane category 

 

Then, there is an exact equivalence of categories

 

given by a functor induced from cokernel functor  sending a pair . In particular, since  is regular, Bertini's theorem shows  is only a finite product of categories.

Computational tools

Knörrer periodicity 
There is a Fourier-Mukai transform  on the derived categories of two related varieties giving an equivalence of their singularity categories. This equivalence is called Knörrer periodicity. This can be constructed as follows: given a flat morphism  from a separated regular Noetherian scheme of finite Krull dimension, there is an associated scheme  and morphism  such that  where  are the coordinates of the -factor. And the fiber . Then, there is an injection  and a projection  forming an -bundle. The Fourier-Mukai transform

induces an equivalence of categories

called Knörrer periodicity. There is another form of this periodicity where  is replaced by the polynomial . These periodicity theorems are the main computational techniques because it allows for a reduction in the analysis of the singularity categories.

Computations 
Then, the D-brane category of the Landau–Ginzburg model is equivalent to the singularity category . Over the algebra  there are indecomposable objects

 

whose morphisms can be completely understood. For any pair  there are morphisms  where

 for  these are the natural projections
 for  these are multiplication by 

where every other morphism is a composition and linear combination of these morphisms. There are many other cases which can be explicitly computed, using the table of singularities found in Knörrer's original paper.

See also
Derived category
Triangulated category
Perfect complex
Semiorthogonal decomposition
Fourier–Mukai transform
Bridgeland stability condition
Homological mirror symmetry
Derived Categories notes - http://www.math.lsa.umich.edu/~idolga/derived9.pdf

References

Research articles 

 A noncommutative version of Beilinson's theorem
 Derived Categories of Toric Varieties
 Derived Categories of Toric Varieties II

Algebraic geometry
Noncommutative geometry